Danielle Catherine Letourneau (born May 3, 1993) is a Canadian professional squash player who represents Canada. She reached a career-high world ranking of World No. 18 in December 2021. She also represented Cornell University (2011–15) and played in the number 1 position during her four years. Letourneau was named First Team All American and First Team All Ivy each year.

References

External links 

1993 births
Canadian female squash players
Cornell Big Red women's squash players
Franco-Albertan people
Living people
Sportspeople from Calgary
Squash players at the 2019 Pan American Games
Pan American Games medalists in squash
Pan American Games silver medalists for Canada
Medalists at the 2019 Pan American Games
21st-century Canadian women